Mount Miller may refer to:

Mount Miller, Alaska
Mount Miller (Enderby Land), Antarctica
Mount Miller (Ross Dependency), Antarctica